Grégory Proment (born 10 December 1978) is a French former professional footballer who played as a midfielder for FC Metz, Stade Malherbe Caen, and Antalyaspor. He is currently the assistant coach of his former club Caen's reserve team.

Club career
Born in Cormeilles-en-Parisis, Val-d'Oise, Proment spent most of his career playing for FC Metz, making 261 appearances in six seasons, and Stade Malherbe Caen. After winning promotion from Ligue 2 with SM Caen, Proment signed a three-year deal with Antalyaspor in June 2010. However, he left the club after making only eight league appearances in January 2011.

International career
Proment won the 1997 UEFA European Under-18 Championship with France.

References

External links

1978 births
Living people
Footballers from Val-d'Oise
Association football midfielders
French footballers
France youth international footballers
FC Metz players
Stade Malherbe Caen players
Antalyaspor footballers
Ligue 1 players
Ligue 2 players
Süper Lig players
Championnat National players
French expatriate footballers
French expatriate sportspeople in Turkey
Expatriate footballers in Turkey
People from Cormeilles-en-Parisis